List of current Bellator MMA fighters records current Bellator MMA (Bellator) fighters' information, country origins, recent fighter signings and departures, fight schedules and results and the champion of each division. Unlike the UFC, Bellator does allow its fighters to compete in other promotions, so many fighters on this list may appear in MMA events outside of Bellator.

Background 
Bellator MMA (formerly known as "Bellator Fighting Championships") promotion was started in 2008 by Bjorn Rebney and Brad Epstein as a tournament based alternative to other MMA organizations such as the Ultimate Fighting Championship and Strikeforce. Prior to 2015, when president Scott Coker made the decision to drop the 8-man tournament format, Bellator fighters participated in a series of tournament bouts in a set weight class over a season (usually between 10 and 13 events over 3 or 4 months). The winners of these tournaments were crowned Bellator champions, with the winners of successive tournaments in the same weight class earning the spot of no. 1 contender.

Notes/key 
 This list provides an up-to-date roster of all fighters currently competing under the Bellator MMA promotional banner. The list excluded fighters who have not fought for more than two years and are not subjected to suspension.
 All names presented are in accordance with Sherdog website profiles and may include common nicknames or alternative spellings rather than birth names.
 Fighters are organized by weight class and within their weight class by their date of debut in Bellator MMA.
 MMA records below are retrieved from Sherdog's website.
 The flags listed in these tables are in accordance with the Sherdog's website and may not fully or accurately represent the full citizenship of the peoples listed. 
WC = Weight Class; G = Gender; SW = Strawweight; FYW = Flyweight; BW = Bantamweight; FW = Featherweight; LW = Lightweight; WW = Welterweight; MW = Middleweight; LHW = Light heavyweight; HW = Heavyweight; WSW = Women's Strawweight; WFYW = Women's Flyweight; WBW = Women's Bantamweight; and WFW = Women's Featherweight.
 Fighters' age and height are based on information obtained from Sherdog's website.
 Each fight record has four categories: wins, losses, draws and no-contests (NC).
 Number of fighters in each division is counted as per date indicated only for the number could change week by week.
 Rankings are based on information obtained from the UFC's website and updated when information has been obtained from the Bellator's website ( /  = movement in rankings, (C) = Champion, (IC) = Interim Champion, and (NR) = not previously ranked).
 The tables are sortable and the calculation for Bellator MMA and MMA records (Win–loss-Draw (No Contest)) are formulated as follows: 
 Plus one point of the total wins for fighters having not lost a fight: 5–0–0 = 6
 Negative points of total losses for fighters having not won a fight: 0–3–0 = -3
 Add number of wins to the winning percentage: 10–1–0 = 10.90 | 10 + (10/11)
 A draw counts as 0.5: 8–4–1 = 8.65 | 8 + (8.5/13)
 No contest does not factor as one of the variables of the calculation: 8–2–0 (1 NC) = 8.80 | 8 + (8/10)

Recent signings 

The fighters in this section have either signed with the Bellator, have recently returned from an announced retirement, or have yet to make their Bellator debut.

Rankings 

The inaugural Bellator fighter rankings were revealed on March 29, 2021. Fighters are rated by a panel made up of 17 MMA media members. The panel votes for the top active fighters in Bellator by both weight class and pound-for-pound. A fighter can be ranked in multiple divisions at the same time in divisions they have competed. The champions and interim champions are placed in the top positions of their respective weight classes and only the champions are eligible to be voted for in the pound-for-pound rankings. Fighters are eligible to be ranked for up to 15 months after competing in each weight class, with the exception of a fighter competing in a World Grand Prix tournament in a different weight class. Fighters serving non-medical suspensions of longer than six months are not eligible to be ranked.

The rankings for Bellator's fighters are updated the Monday after a Bellator live event.

Updated as of March 14, 2023.

Current champions, weight classes and status
Bellator  currently uses nine different weight classes. This list of champions is updated as of September 10, 2021.

Heavyweights (265 lb, 120 kg)

Light Heavyweights (205 lb, 93 kg)

Middleweights (185 lb, 84 kg)

Welterweights (170 lb, 77 kg)

Lightweights (155 lb, 70 kg)

Featherweights (145 lb, 65 kg)

Bantamweights (135 lb, 61 kg) 

{| class="wikitable sortable" style="text-align:center"
!width=3%|
!width=13%|Name
!width=3%|Age
!width=7%|Ht.
!width=13%|Nickname
!width=25%|Result / next fight / status
!width=3%|Ref
!width=5%|Months since Last Bout
! width="12%" |Bellator record
! width="12%" |MMA record 
|-
|
|  
|
|
|
| - Bellator 290 (Inglewood) - Nikita Mikhailov
|
|
|12–6 
|15–7 
|-
|
|James Gallagher 
|
|
|The Strabanimal
|(February 16, 2023) - Gallagher Pulled out - Out of Bellator 292 (San Jose) - Leandro Higo
|
|
|8–2
|11–2
|-
|
|Brian Moore
|
|
|The Pikeman
| - Bellator 291 (Dublin) - Luca Iovine
|
|
|7–5
|16–9
|-
|
|
|
|
|No Love
|Bellator 295 (Honolulu) - Raufeon Stots
|
|
|6–1
|17–1
|-
|
|
|
|
|Pitbull
|(February 16, 2023) - Gallagher Pulled out - Out of Bellator 292 (San Jose) - James Gallagher
|
|
|4–4
|21–6
|-
|
|
|
|
|Spaniard
|Rizin 42 (Tokyo) - Naoki Inoue
|
|
|9–3
|27–4
|-
|
|Cass Bell
|
|
|The Mean Green Fighting Machine
| - Bellator 292 (San Jose) - Josh Hill
|
|
|6–3
|6–3
|-
|
|
|
|
|
|Bellator 295 (Honolulu) - Ray Borg/ Moving to Flyweight
|
|
|2–2
|31–5
|-
|
|Jornel Lugo
|
|
|A1
| - Bellator 290 (Los Angeles) - Jaylon Bates
|
|
|5–2
|8–2
|-
|
| (IC)
|
|
|Supa
|Bellator 295 (Honolulu) - Patchy Mix
|
|
|7–0
|19–1
|-
|
| (C)
|
|
|The Phenom
|
|
|
|4–0
|22–5
|-
|
|
|
|
|Gentleman
| - Bellator 292 (San Jose) - Cass Bell
|
|
|4–2
|22–5
|-
|
|Jaylon Bates
|
|
|New Breed
| - Bellator 290 (Los Angeles) - Jornel Lugo
|
|
|7–0
|7–0
|-
|
|
|
|
|Tiger'
| - Bellator 289 (Uncasville) - Patchy Mix
|
|
|3–2
|19–3
|-
|
|Matheus Mattos
|
|
|Adamas|
|
|
|1–1
|13–2–1
|-
|
|Cee Jay Hamilton
|
|
|The Autobot| - Bellator 286 (Long Beach) - Richard Palencia
|
|
|1–2
|16–9
|-
|
|Blaine Shutt
|
|
|The Shuttdown|
|
|
|0–2
|8–6
|-
|
|
|
|
|The Italian Gangster|Bellator 294 (Honolulu) - Marcos Breno
|
|
|3–1
|13–2
|-
|
| 
|
|
|The Pikey| - Bellator 285 (Dublin) - Jordan Winski
|
|
|2–1
|19–3
|-
|
|Jordan Winski
|
|
|I'm Gonna| - Bellator 285 (Dublin) - Brett Johns
|
|
|1–2
|12–4
|-
|
|Bobby Seronio III
|
|
|The Humble Warrior|(March 7, 2023) Unknown Reasons - Out of Bellator 292 (San Jose) - Alberto Garcia	
|
|
|3–0
|3–0
|-
|
|Nikita Mikhailov
|
|
|
| - Bellator 290 (Inglewood) - Darrion Caldwell
|
|
|3–1
|10–2
|-
|
|Jared Scoggins
|
|
|Psycho| - Bellator 289 (Uncasville) - Cass Bell
|
|
|0–2
||10–3
|-
|
|Marcos Breno
|
|
|
|Bellator 294 (Honolulu) - Danny Sabatello
|
|
|1–0
|15–2
|-
|
|Arivaldo Silva
|
|
|Carniça| - Bellator 285 (Dublin) - Brian Moore
|
|
|0–1
|19–11
|-
|
|Richard Palencia
|
|
|
| - Bellator 286 (Long Beach) - Cee Jay Hamilton
|
|
|0–1
|10–1
|-
|
|Sarvarjon Khamidov
|
|
|Sarvar| - Bellator 287 (Milan) - José Maria Tomé
|
|
|1–0
|14–0
|-
|
|Luca Iovine
|
|
|Duke| - Bellator 291 (Dublin) - Brian Moore
|
|
|1–1
|18–9
|-
|}

 Women's Featherweights (145 lb, 65 kg) 

 Women's Flyweights (125 lb, 56 kg) 

 Women's Strawweights (115 lb, 52 kg) 

 Unless otherwise cited, all records are retrieved from sherdog.com. Unless otherwise cited, all fighters listed are retrieved from Bellator.com.''

See also
List of Bellator MMA alumni
List of Bellator champions
List of Bellator events
List of current ACA fighters
List of current Brave CF fighters
List of current Combate Global fighters
List of current Invicta FC fighters
List of current KSW fighters
List of current ONE fighters
List of current PFL fighters
List of current Rizin FF fighters
List of current Road FC fighters
List of current UFC fighters

Notes

References

External links 
Bellator

Bellator MMA
Lists of mixed martial artists
Bellator MMA fighters